Ajjahalli, Maddur  is a village in the southern state of Karnataka, India. It is located in the Maddur taluk of Mandya district in Karnataka.

See also
 Mandya
 Districts of Karnataka
 Maddur Taluk, Malagaranahally post
 Ajjahally

References

External links
 http://Mandya.nic.in/

Villages in Mandya district